Showkat Baksh, also known as Charles Baksh (born 15 March 1938) is a former cricketer, a right-handed batsman who played for the Canadian cricket team. He made only two appearances at a high level, both in June 1979: a match against Fiji in the ICC Trophy and another (his only One Day International) against Australia at Birmingham in the World Cup two weeks later.

References

External links
 

Canadian cricketers
Canada One Day International cricketers
Living people
1940 births
Canadian people of Indian descent
Trinidad and Tobago cricketers
Trinidad and Tobago emigrants to Canada
Trinidad and Tobago people of Indian descent